"We Lost the Road" is a song by the Bee Gees, it was written by Barry Gibb and Robin Gibb and was released on their 1972 album To Whom It May Concern.

It was originally recorded in sessions for Trafalgar on January 28, 1971 (and the first song recorded for the album). Lead vocals by Barry, with the lyrics of verse 3 before verse 2, It is likely that many other songs had alternate vocal tracks that were replaced, most of which are totally gone now unless they survived on acetates or rough mix tapes, but it was dropped from the album, This track was re-recorded with lead vocals by Barry and Robin, and that version was released in 1972.

Personnel
 Barry Gibb - vocals, guitar
 Robin Gibb - vocals
 Maurice Gibb - bass, piano, guitar, organ, harmony vocals
 Alan Kendall - guitar
 Geoff Bridgford - drums

References

1972 songs
Bee Gees songs
Songs written by Barry Gibb
Songs written by Robin Gibb
Song recordings produced by Robert Stigwood
Song recordings produced by Barry Gibb
Song recordings produced by Robin Gibb
Song recordings produced by Maurice Gibb